The Justice World Tour was the fourth concert tour by Canadian singer Justin Bieber. The tour was in support of his fifth and sixth studio albums, Changes (2020) and Justice (2021).

Promoted by T-Mobile, the tour was originally set to begin on May 14, 2020, in Seattle and to conclude on September 26, 2020, in East Rutherford, New Jersey. However, due to the COVID-19 pandemic, all of the original planned dates were postponed to 2021, and later to 2022. The tour officially began on February 18, 2022, in San Diego and was scheduled to end on March 25, 2023, in Kraków. However, the tour ended in Rio de Janeiro on September 4, 2022, due to Bieber prioritizing his health, after 49 shows in three continents, with the remaining shows being cancelled in February 2023.

Background 
During the last quarter of 2019, especially in December, Bieber started teasing his musical comeback via his social media. On December 20, Bieber tweeted that something was going to happen on the December 24, December 31, 2019, as well as on January 3 and 4, 2020. On December 24, he released a video on YouTube where he announced that he would release his fifth album during 2020, on December 31 was released trailer for Justin Bieber: Seasons, the first single of his fifth studio album "Yummy" was released on January 3, and on January 13 he announced the first round of dates for his new world tour, releasing North American dates. Jaden Smith and Kehlani were originally set to be opening acts. On March 6, 2020, several stadium dates were downsized to arena dates, with shows moved to arena venues adjacent to the stadiums. Bieber's team cited "unforeseen circumstances" and low ticket sales.

On April 1, 2020, it was announced the tour was postponed due to the ongoing COVID-19 pandemic. On July 23, Bieber released rescheduled tour dates set to be played in 2021. However, on April 30, 2021, Bieber announced that the tour was to be postponed to 2022. The new tour dates were announced on May 6, 2021. Jaden Smith, Eddie Benjamin, ¿Téo?, and Harry Hudson were announced as opening acts for North American dates. On November 15, 2021, Bieber announced an additional 98 dates, spanning into late 2022 and early 2023 with shows across North America, Europe, South America, Africa, Israel and Oceania. On March 9, 2022, Bieber announced 4 shows in Japan. On March 24, 2022, Bieber announced 2 shows in Malaysia, a show in Indonesia and added an additional date in Japan. Additional dates have also been announced in Bahrain, the Philippines, Dubai, New Delhi, Sydney, Amsterdam, Dublin, and London.

On September 6, 2022, two days after the first concert in Latin America as part of the Rock in Rio festival, it was announced that all remaining dates of the tour would be postponed due to Bieber prioritizing his health. In a statement shared on social media, the singer said that "After getting off stage, the exhaustion overtook me and I realized that I need to make my health the priority right now. So I'm going to take a break from touring for the time being. I'm going to be OK, but I need time to rest and get better." On September 15, 2022, an announcement posted on the official page for the tour clarified that only the dates until October 18 had been cancelled, with "all other shows remaining as scheduled unless otherwise adviced". However, on October 6, it was announced that the concert in Rio de Janeiro was the final performance of the tour, with the period of mass postponement extended to all the following shows, which have yet to be rescheduled.

Set list
This set list is representative of the show on February 18, 2022, in San Diego. It is not representative of all concerts for the duration of the tour.

 "Somebody"
 "Hold On"
 "Deserve You"
 "Holy"
 "Where Are Ü Now"
 "What Do You Mean?"
 "Yummy"
 "Changes" / "Swap It Out" / "At Least For Now" / "Hold Tight"
 "Love Yourself"
 "Off My Face"
 "Confident"
 "All That Matters"
 "Don't Go" / "Second Emotion" / "No Sense" / "Honest"
 "Sorry"
 "Love You Different"
 "As I Am"
 "Ghost"
 "Lonely"
 "2 Much"
 "Intentions"
 "Boyfriend"
 "Baby"
Encore
 "Peaches"
 "Anyone"

Additional notes
 During the show in Los Angeles on March 7, Bieber welcomed Leon Bridges on stage to perform "River" and also performed "Don't Go" with Don Toliver, and "Intentions" with Quavo.
 During the show in Los Angeles on March 8, Bieber performed "Stay" with the Kid Laroi.
 During the shows in Atlanta on March 21 & March 22, Bieber performed "Intentions" with Quavo.
 Starting on March 31 with the show in Newark until April 9 in Tampa, Bieber replaced "Changes" with "Swap It Out". Then he performed the same song again, starting on July 31 with the show in Lucca.
 Starting on April 11 with the show in Orlando until April 19 in Cincinnati, Bieber performed "At Least for Now" in place of "Changes".
 During the show in Orlando on April 11, Bieber performed "Second Emotion" in place of "Don't Go".
 During the show in Miami on April 13, Bieber performed "No Sense" in place of "Don't Go".
 Starting on April 24 with the show in Des Moines, Bieber performed "Hold Tight" in place of "Changes".
 Starting on April 29 with the show in Houston, Bieber performed "Honest" with Don Toliver in place of "Don't Go".
 During the show in Chicago on May 10, Bieber performed "Holy" with Chance the Rapper and "Intentions" with Quavo.
 During the show in Brooklyn on June 3, Bieber performed "Attention" with Omah Lay.
 During the show in Rio de Janeiro on September 4 before focusing his health issues, "Love You Different" and "Boyfriend" were not performed.

Tour dates

Cancelled shows

Notes

References 

Justin Bieber concert tours
2022 concert tours